Matter is a peer-reviewed scientific journal that covers the general field of materials science. It is published by Cell Press and the editor-in-chief is Steven W. Cranford.

External links

Publications established in 2019
Cell Press academic journals
Monthly journals
English-language journals
Materials science journals